Verner Liik (26 April 1897 Emmaste Parish, Hiiu County – 19 November 1958 Tallinn) was an Estonian politician. He was a member of III Riigikogu. On 16 June 1926, he resigned his position and he was replaced by Benedikt Oskar Oja.

References

1897 births
1958 deaths
Members of the Riigikogu, 1926–1929